Larginus Proclus was a Germanic soothsayer in the 1st century AD. Using a method of divination based on interpretation of lightning, he predicted that the Roman emperor Domitian would die on a certain day. He was in consequence sent by the governor of Germany to Rome, where he was condemned to death by the emperor himself. The punishment was deferred so that he could be executed after the prophesied date of death. However, Domitian was indeed assassinated on the date Larginus Proclus had prophesied, so his punishment was commuted and he was awarded 400,000 sesterces from Domitian's successor Nerva.

References 

1st-century Germanic people

Classical oracles